The Utah Transit Authority (UTA) is a special service district responsible for providing public transportation throughout the Wasatch Front of Utah, in the United States, which includes the metropolitan areas of Ogden, Park City, Provo, Salt Lake City and Tooele. It operates fixed route buses, flex route buses, express buses, ski buses, three light rail lines in Salt Lake County (TRAX), a streetcar line in Salt Lake City (the S-Line), and a commuter rail train (FrontRunner) from Ogden through Salt Lake City to Provo. UTA is headquartered in Salt Lake City with operations and garages in locations throughout the Wasatch Front, including Ogden, Midvale and Orem. Light rail vehicles are stored and maintained at yards at locations in South Salt Lake and Midvale. UTA's commuter rail equipment is stored and serviced at a facility in Salt Lake City.

History 
The Utah Transit Authority traces its roots to 1953 when several bus companies united to form the organization. Ironically, among the constitutive companies of the UTA was National City Lines, famous for its alleged cannibalization of American streetcar lines on behalf of General Motors. NSL had bought out and promptly decommissioned the electric trolleys operated by the Utah Light and Traction Company in Salt Lake City neighborhoods like the Avenues in the 1940s.

Throughout the 1950s buses became more and more unpopular, with low gas prices and subsidized construction of highways like Interstate 15. By 1960, bus ridership was only about one third the level of war-time Salt Lake, and the average age of riders was 14.

In 1969, the Utah State Legislature passed the Utah Public Transit District Act, which allowed individual communities to address transportation needs by forming local transit districts. UTA was subsequently founded on March 3, 1970, when the cities of Sandy, Salt Lake City, and Murray voted to form a transit district. Service was extended to Weber and Davis counties in 1973 and to Utah County in 1985.

UTA saw rapid expansion through the mid-1970s and 1980s. It strove to streamline the bus system, connecting the east and west sides of the Salt Lake Valley with east–west routes along 2100 South, 3300 South/3500 South, and 4500 South/4700 South, in 1975. Four bus routes to Granger, Hunter (which today comprise West Valley City), Kearns, Magna, and Tooele were also created the same year. Sunday service on 25 routes began in 1975, only to be removed in 1988. (Sunday service resumed in 2001.) In 1976 the UTA began offering ski bus service to Alta, Brighton, Snowbird, and Solitude ski resorts in Big and Little Cottonwood Canyons. Today, the UTA offers seasonal buses to those four resorts as well as Snowbasin Resort and Powder Mountain in Weber County and Sundance Resort in Utah County.

Since the turn of the century, the entire service area of UTA has seen bus route redesigns, beginning with Utah County in 2000. Weber and Davis Counties saw an overhaul of their bus routing in 2002. The largest and most comprehensive change in routing occurred in August 2007 in Salt Lake County, with the goal of increasing ridership by twelve percent. Prior to 2007, night service had different numbering and routing than regular daytime service. After the redesign, nighttime routes were to retain the same routing and numbering as their daytime counterparts. Routes were consolidated as well, with 69 routes reduced to 60. Fifteen-minute service during weekday daytime hours was extended from two to 11 routes, and all other routes in the system had 30-minute service during weekday peak hours at the very least. "Fast buses," which connected suburbs to the city and charged the same fare as local buses (as opposed to express buses, which required a higher fare), were also introduced and expanded. The redesign proposal was met with criticism, with low-income advocacy groups claiming that the redesign focused too heavily on commuters rather than the disadvantaged. The route redesign achieved its intended goal—from 2007 to 2011, bus ridership in the entire system increased from 77,500 to 88,700, an increase of 18 percent.

Beginning in 2010, a decline in funding that UTA was receiving from sales tax revenues resulted in service reductions. Fast bus trips were substantially reduced, with many fast bus routes being cut altogether. Saturday and night service saw cuts as well. The opening of two new TRAX extensions exacerbated bus route service cuts, especially in the western side of the valley; routes that previously traveled from the western suburbs to downtown would end at Green Line stations, with riders expected to complete the rest of their journeys via the Green Line. For the first time in 2010, there was no service on Memorial and Labor days. Service on those holidays was later restored, and as of 2020 UTA provides bus and rail service on most holidays with the exception of Thanksgiving, Christmas and New Year's Day.  As UTA's rail expansion projects draw to a close and revenues increase, the agency has indicated that it will slowly begin restoring service in the near future.

Amidst the service cuts and rail expansions, UTA struck a deal with Park City and Summit County to begin operating an express bus between Salt Lake City and Park City in October 2011. This express service is called PC-SLC Connect.

Bus service 

UTA currently offers over 120 bus routes within its operational area.  Most of these routes provide regular transportation throughout the day, while many are primarily commuter routes. Some are special services, such as ski routes that only operate seasonally. Current ski routes include route 953 (Alta/Snowbird/Midvale), route 972 (Brighton/Solitude/Midvale), route 994 (Alta/Snowbird/Sandy), Route 880 (Sundance/Provo), route 674 (Powder Mountain/Ogden), route 675 (Snowbasin/Ogden) and route 677 (Snowbasin/Layton). Occasionally, will also offer service for special events or extend service on certain days of the year such as New Year's Eve. UTA regularly modifies or changes its bus routes, but whenever reasonably possible (other than temporary detours) limits the adjustments to Change Days. The majority of bus routes stay within the Ogden to Provo corridor, with limited service south to Santaquin, in Utah County, and north to Brigham City, in Box Elder County. Service to Santaquin is limited to one route, the 805, which is an Express bus to Utah Valley University. In Brigham City, Rt. 630 connects Downtown Brigham City with the Ogden Transit Center. Rt. F638, (F stands for Flex route) runs around Brigham City approximately every hour from 8am-4pm every weekday, no weekend service.

Bus Rapid Transit 

The Utah Valley Express line operates between Provo Central station and Orem Central station via Brigham Young University and Utah Valley University, utilizing a dedicated busway across most of the route located in the center median of University Parkway, University Avenue, and East 700 North. The line opened in August 2018 and uses 60-foot articulated buses with doors on both sides of the bus to load passengers from busway stations located in the center median.

The Ogden Express line is currently under construction between the Ogden Intermodal Transit Center and McKay-Dee Hospital, utilizing a dedicated busway that cuts through the campus of Weber State University and in the center median of Harrison Boulevard. On August 29, 2022, a short section of the line, entirely on the Weber State University busway opened. The rest of the line is expected to be completed in 2023. The line will use 40-foot battery-electric buses.

UTA previously operated the 3500 South MAX line between Magna and the Millcreek TRAX station via West Valley City. The line was suspended in 2020 at the start of the COVID-19 pandemic and is now permanently discontinued.

Free trolley service 

UTA has three bus routes that run trolley-replica buses, the 601, 628, and 667, which serve Ogden, Midtown (Clearfield/Layton) and Farmington (Lagoon amusement park), respectively. Service is free on these routes. All three routes run 30 minute service on weekdays, and 60 minute service on Saturdays. None of the three routes run on Sunday.

Flex routes 
These "flexible" routes are called Flex routes and are indicated by the letter "F" at the beginning of the route number (e.g. F618). Flex routes combine the convenience of curb-to-curb service with regular fixed routes making them a viable option for many paratransit riders. Certain rules and restrictions apply to Flex routes:
Only two deviations are allowed per trip; however, even with deviations, routes maintain a schedule and never depart designated stops early.
Riding Flex routes costs the same as regular routes; however, the cost for deviations is an additional $1.25 (in addition to the regular fare).
Deviations may be scheduled up to seven days in advance but not less than two hours prior to travel time and can be made by calling 801-BUS-RIDE (801-287-7433) between 8:30 a.m. and 3 p.m.

Paratransit 

Throughout its area of operation, UTA provides paratransit service in addition to its FLEX routes for qualifying disabled passengers that are unable to, either temporarily or permanently, utilized the other transportation services provided by UTA (including bus service, TRAX, the S-Line, and FrontRunner). Although the cost to UTA for this service is substantial to UTA, the fare remains the same for passengers.

Paratransit fare is $4 for one-way curb-to-curb transportation. Riders must be pre-qualified to use the service.

Transit centers 
UTA operates three transit centers which are open and staffed by customer service personnel during business hours (or extended business hours) Monday through Friday (except holidays). The first two are Salt Lake Central station and the Ogden Intermodal Transit Center, which are both served by FrontRunner and inter-county and local bus service (as well as TRAX, in the case of Salt Lake Central).  All other transportation hubs operated by UTA (including Central Pointe, Murray/Murray Central, West Valley Central, Orem Central and Provo) stations are not staffed by customer service personnel.

In addition to the transit centers, UTA offers customer service by telephone for extended business hours Monday through Saturday.  In addition to English, assistance can usually be provided in the following languages: Chinese, French, Spanish, Tongan, and Vietnamese.

Active fleet

Buses

Light Rail

Commuter Rail

TRAX light rail 

Population growth and accompanying congestion led to the study of the feasibility of light rail in the Salt Lake Valley in the early 1990s. A 1993 initiative to use tax revenues to purchase an underutilized rail corridor for potential light rail use was rejected by Salt Lake County voters. The County Commission opposed increasing taxes for light rail and even hired a lobbyist to this end. Nonetheless, the Utah Transit Authority moved forward and was able to make the purchase using other available funds.

UTA also lobbied for funding and in August 1995 won $240 million from the federal government as part of the budget for I-15 reconstruction. The light rail system was called TRAX. This federal grant amounted to over two-thirds the cost of the Blue Line to Sandy, and further bills would fund a second line to the University of Utah. Salt Lake City's successful bid to host the 2002 Winter Olympics gave the light rail project some priority over transit projects in other cities competing for federal funds; Secretary of Transportation Federico Peña explained, "The Winter Olympics in Salt Lake are not just Salt Lake's Olympics. They are the nation's Olympics." Nonetheless, UTA's cost-effective light rail project merited the support of the Federal Transit Administration and would have been funded and constructed regardless of the Olympics.

TRAX became operational December 4, 1999 with an initial route of —the Blue Line, then simply dubbed the Sandy/Salt Lake Line—from Sandy to Downtown Salt Lake City. In celebration, UTA offered free rides on the new line all day, and local residents stood in long lines to be packed into the new light rail cars. The Blue Line was expanded in April 2008 to Salt Lake Central station, and as part of UTA's FrontLines 2015 project, a three-station expansion of the line further south to Draper was completed.

Due to federal funding, the initial  of the Red Line (or the University Line, as it was initially named), from downtown Salt Lake to the University of Utah, was operational by December 15, 2001—after 16 months of construction and well ahead of the original schedule. Construction was expedited to be completed before the 2002 Winter Olympics, to enable spectators to take TRAX to the opening ceremonies at Rice-Eccles Stadium. In light of heightened security in the wake of the 9/11 attacks, however, light rail service was suspended during the opening and closing ceremonies. Buses were used instead, and though also vulnerable, transported attendees without incident. At this same time TRAX lines began to be referred to by a color-coded name (rather than destinations) and the Red Line trains no longer traveled downtown, instead bypassing the city center and heading south and then southwest.

The success of TRAX led to the creation of a third line—the Green Line—which runs from the Airport station at the Salt Lake International Airport through Downtown Salt Lake City to West Valley Central station in West Valley City. This line also originally opened on August 7, 2011, and services 18 stations. The Airport extension of the Green Line, which added six new stations and provided rail service from downtown Salt Lake City to the Salt Lake International Airport for the first time, opened for service on April 14, 2013.

FrontRunner commuter rail 

In 2002, UTA announced a deal with Union Pacific to purchase a segment of track and right-of-way for a commuter rail line from Salt Lake City to Pleasant View, just northwest of Ogden. The new commuter train was named the FrontRunner in reference to the fact that it was intended to run up and down the Wasatch Front. Construction on the FrontRunner corridor began on August 10, 2005; seven stations opened running from Ogden to Salt Lake City on April 26, 2008. As part of the FrontLines 2015 project, the commuter rail corridor has been expanded south  to Provo. Service began on the new southern extension on December 10, 2012. Future expansion may extend the corridor north to Brigham City in Box Elder County, and south to Payson and then Santaquin, with the possibility of even extending as far south as Nephi in Juab County.

In late 2020, the UTA began a virtual Open House event where citizens of Tooele were able to comment on a potential expansion of FrontRunner or bus service from Salt Lake City to Tooele County.

The S Line 

The S Line (formerly known as Sugar House Streetcar) is a streetcar transit line that connects Sugar House (a neighborhood of Salt Lake City) with the neighboring city of South Salt Lake, as well as the UTA TRAX system. It is a joint project between UTA, Salt Lake City, and South Salt Lake. The S-Line runs along the old Denver and Rio Grande Western Railroad (D&RGW) line (which lies between 2100 South and the I-80 freeway) from the Central Pointe TRAX Station in South Salt Lake east to McClelland Street (1040 East) in Salt Lake City. The S Line line differs slightly from the TRAX lines in that it travels a slower speed, stops more often, and has "stops" instead of "stations".

Phase 1 of the S-Line opened for service on December 8, 2013. Future plans (Phase 2) include extending the line to run further north through Sugar House, but funding for the extension has not yet been secured.

In addition to the S-Line, several other areas in and around Salt Lake City are being evaluated for similar streetcar lines, but no specific projects have been announced so far.

Rideshare 
UTA also provides many commuting alternatives through UTA Rideshare. Many of the Rideshare options involve a combination other transportation alternatives (e.g., bicycle lockers at rail stations, bicycle racks on buses as well as the FrontRunner and TRAX trains). While many of these alternatives are provided by UTA, some are coordinated with other alternative transportation alternatives (e.g., Enterprise CarShare).

The commuters must also provide designated drivers and a bookkeeper.

Other services of Rideshare include the Ridematching Database for those seeking partners for more traditional carpooling, suggestions for other alternatives to regular commuting, and options for employers to encourage and/or subsidize many of the alternatives suggested by Rideshare.

Change Day 
UTA periodically adjusts its bus, TRAX, S-Line and FrontRunner schedules to meet changing ridership needs. Unless an urgent need arises, such as when a fairly major adjustment to resolve connections with the FrontRunner was made in February 2013, UTA generally limits Change Days to the middle part of April, August, and December each year.  Changes can include new routes, elimination of routes, route changes, and schedule changes. Many of UTA's seasonal bus routes (such as ski bus service) also either begin or end on Change Days.

Area of operations 
UTA operates in Box Elder, Davis, Salt Lake, Summit, Tooele, Utah, and Weber counties. Access extends from Brigham City in the north to Santaquin in the south. Service area includes of all cities in between, heading as far west as Grantsville in Tooele County and east to Park City in Summit County.  UTA also provides service to many of the major ski resorts along the Wasatch Front during the winter months.

Accessibility 
All of UTA's TRAX and FrontRunner trains and stations, streetcars and streetcar stops, and buses are compliant with Americans with Disabilities Act and are therefore accessible to those with disabilities. Signage at the stations, on the passenger platforms, and on the trains and streetcars clearly indicate accessibility options. Ramps on the passenger platform and assistance from the train operator may be necessary for wheelchair boarding on the Blue Line on weekdays only; these ramps are not used on weekends or on the Red or Green Lines. In accordance with the Utah Clean Air Act and UTA ordinance, smoking is prohibited on UTA property.

Park-&-Ride 
There are numerous free Park-&-Ride lots throughout UTA's operational area. Many are operated by UTA in conjunction with its TRAX and FrontRunner stations or other transit centers, but others are maintained by the Utah Department of Transportation (UDOT). In addition, The Church of Jesus Christ of Latter-day Saints (LDS Church) has designated many of its meetinghouses' parking lots for use as well. Some Park & Ride lots offer 24-hour parking, while others offer extended or multi-day parking.

UTA operates parking garages in conjunction with two of its stations, the Jordan Valley TRAX station in West Jordan and the Draper FrontRunner station in Draper. UTA also has a "kiss-and-ride" lot at the Draper FrontRunner station. The only parking provided at the Draper station is within the parking garage. There was also parking available on the nearby street before the city of Draper prohibited parking along FrontRunner Boulevard.

Funding

UTA funding sources 

 Local option sales tax – 70.9 percent
 Federal funding – 13.1 percent
 Fares – 11.2 percent
 Investments – 3.1 percent
 Advertising – 1.3 percent
 Other – .3 percent

Fares 
UTA's bus fares are fixed price, based on the service type, with express routes costing more. As of April 1, 2013 the basic bus and TRAX fare is US$2.50, and Paratransit is US$4  A fare on one mode of transit will usually transfer to another (e.g., bus to TRAX, FrontRunner to TRAX or bus, etc.). Paper and electronic transfers are issued and valid for use on other buses, TRAX and the S-Line. Fares on FrontRunner are distance-based and can be transferred to TRAX or bus, but TRAX or bus fare cannot be transferred to FrontRunner without purchase of an upgrade. Exemptions apply to kids below 6, who ride free with fare-paying rider, up to 3.

Numerous fare products and a variety of discounts and discount passes are available for eligible riders. These include all day and monthly passes purchased at local stores; passes for college students, minors, and seniors; Group Passes; and employer-sponsored passes. Ticket machines at all FrontRunner, MAX, TRAX  and S-Line stations accept cash and major debit and credit cards. While ticket machines provide change for cash purchases, cash paying riders must have the exact fare amount upon boarding buses, as change is not available.

In 2009, UTA launched an automated fare collection system (ARC) to collect fares with contactless smart cards. As the first full AFC system in the United States to accept contactless bank cards, the UTA system, implemented in conjunction with Vix Technology, received the 2009 Innovation Award from the American Public Transportation Association and the 2009 Sesames Transportation Award.

UTA is now offering a prepaid fare card called FAREPAY. FAREPAY cards can be used to quickly pay fares on any UTA operated transportation (except paratransit). The cards can be purchased online or a UTA customer service center, as well as select retailers.  The cards have a one-time US$3 activation fee, but can then be loaded (or reloaded) with as little as US$5 or as much as US$500.  Reloading of cards may also be done online or at a UTA customer service center, as well as the same select retailers that sell the cards. Riders who pay with FAREPAY receive 40 percent off bus fare, 20 percent off TRAX and S-Line fare and up to 20 percent off FrontRunner fare. This promotion has been extended until December 31, 2017.

UTA currently has a Free Fare Zone in downtown Salt Lake City which allows transportation patrons that both enter and exit bus or TRAX service within the zone to ride at no charge. The zone was originally created in 1985 and covers an area of approximately 36 city blocks. The boundaries are roughly North Temple, 200 East, 500 South and 400 West. TRAX stations within the zone include Arena, City Center, Courthouse, Gallivan Plaza, Planetarium, and Temple Square. In addition, the Free Fare Zone also includes the area of the State Capitol (north to 500 North), the bus stops on 400 South between 200 East and 300 East, and three additional TRAX stations: Library, Old GreekTown, and Salt Lake Central. In June 2012 UTA revealed plans to eliminate the Free Fare Zone, but by September 2012 it announced that it would continue the zone, but with some minor adjustments, including when and how fares are collected for service ending outside the zone.

UTA has been criticized for having some of the highest fares in the transportation industry. In 2011 UTA raised fares as part of a change in the way it handled fuel surcharges. "A recent analysis by The Salt Lake Tribune shows that the UTA already had among the highest bus and train fares in the nation before the new fare hike. Its current total fare of US$2.25 was tied for fifth-highest among 193 transit systems nationally that responded to an American Public Transportation Association survey completed last August."

UTA fares have not increased since 2013. In 2016, UTA published information showing that the US$2.50 cash fare is comparable to other mid-sized agencies. When the US$1.50 FAREPAY fare is taken into consideration, the fare is lower than many other similar public transit agencies.

Leadership and operation 

UTA is governed by a 3-member Board of Trustees that continually directs agency staff to improve public transit along the Wasatch Front. Trustees are appointed by the city and county governments that fund UTA with a local option sales taxes. Board members work with their appointing local representatives to direct UTA so the agency can best meet the needs of individual communities.

Local elected officials may serve on the UTA Board, and one seat is reserved for a member of the Utah Transportation Commission, which is part of the Utah Department of Transportation. The President of the Senate, Speaker of the House, and Governor of the State of Utah each appoint one seat as well.

In July 2013, the Transportation Security Administration (TSA) announced that for the year 2012 UTA had earned the "Gold Standard", TSA's highest security rating. TSA also reported that UTA was among only fifteen other mass transit agencies to have earned this rating for the same period.

Higher salaries of executives has been an issue. In 2015, UTA executives opted out of receiving an increase in their compensation and also refused to receive any of their usual annual bonuses for the 2015 and 2016 annual periods. UTA also revised its compensation policy on May 19, 2015, to bring those who are earning less than those in similar job functions at other transit organizations in line with the industry standards.

In 2016, the newly appointed CEO Jerry Benson announced that two of the executive positions were being removed and the departments under those previous executives responsibilities would be absorbed under the remaining members of the executive team.

CEO Jerry Benson was terminated effective May 7, 2018 following the passing of Utah SB 136.

UTA's current Executive Director is Jay Fox.

Police department 

UTA also operates a law enforcement arm, the Utah Transit Authority Police Department. The department conducts law enforcement services, criminal investigations and public safety throughout bus transit, commuter rail, and light rail systems.

FrontLines 2015 
The purpose of the FrontLines 2015 project was to meet the increasing transportation needs of the Wasatch Front's growing population. It consisted of expansions to both TRAX and FrontRunner and was the largest expansion in UTA's history. UTA relied heavily on sales tax revenues to fund this project. This new expansion allows commuters to travel from Provo to Salt Lake City in less than one hour. FrontRunner South was an extension of the previous line, which ran north from Downtown Salt Lake City to Pleasant View in north Weber County. FrontLines 2015 added/expanded four extensions in the TRAX system including the Mid-Jordan extension, the West Valley City extension, the airport extension, and the Draper extension. While all the projects were set to be completed by the year 2015, all of them were completed well ahead of schedule. The mid-Jordan TRAX and West Valley extensions both opened August 7, 2011 and the airport extension opened April 14, 2013, followed by the Draper extension on August 18, 2013. Just prior to the opening of the Draper extension in August 2013, UTA announced that the FrontLines 2015 project had been completed under budget and years ahead of schedule.

Retired Fleet

See also 

 Transportation in Salt Lake City

Notes

Utah Transit Authority

References

External links 

 
 UTA at UtahRails.net — An index page for UTA's TRAX light rail, the FrontRunner commuter rail train, and UTA's buses, with extensive chronology histories.

 
Bus transportation in Utah
Passenger rail transportation in Utah
Intermodal transportation authorities in Utah
Transit Authority
Wasatch Front
Government agencies established in 1970
Transportation in Box Elder County, Utah
Transportation in Davis County, Utah
Transportation in Salt Lake County, Utah
Transportation in Summit County, Utah
Transportation in Tooele County, Utah
Transportation in Utah County, Utah
Transportation in Weber County, Utah
Transportation in Salt Lake City